Chi Choi is one of the 25 constituencies in the Wong Tai Sin District in Hong Kong. The constituency returns one district councillor to the Wong Tai Sin District Council, with an election every four years.

Chi Choi constituency is loosely based on Kingsford Terrace, Sun Lai Garden, Bay View Garden, Ngau Chi Wan Village and part of Choi Hung Estate in Ngau Chi Wan with an estimated population of 16,202.

Councillors represented

Election results

2010s

2000s

1990s

References

Ngau Chi Wan
Constituencies of Hong Kong
Constituencies of Wong Tai Sin District Council
1999 establishments in Hong Kong
Constituencies established in 1999